Samuel Mann is a New Zealand computer scientist, with interests in computer science education and sustainability. He is a full Professor  at Otago Polytechnic. He has published widely on sustainable practice, both in computing and more generally to apply to any discipline.  Mann was educated at the University of Otago where he studied botany and geography, before completing a PhD in Information Science.

Sustainable Practitioner 
Mann developed the term "sustainable practitioner". In 2007 under Mann's guidance, Otago Polytechnic committed to the strategy that "every graduate may think and act as a sustainable practitioner".  Initiatives have included a Living Campus, and Sustainable Community Enterprise.

Mann is building an oral archive of conversations with sustainable practitioners. This is also broadcast on Otago Access Radio and podcast as Sustainable Lens. The goal is to create a searchable archive of conversations with people from many different fields who are applying their skills to a sustainable future.

CITRENZ 
Since 2011 Mann has served as Chair of Computing and Information Technology Information and Education and Research NZ (CITRENZ).  In that role he oversaw the development of a new suite of computing programmes for all New Zealand polytechnics.

Awards 
In 2009 Mann was awarded the Beeby Fellowship.  The Beeby Fellowship is a joint initiative between the New Zealand Council for Educational Research and the New Zealand National Commission for UNESCO.

Books authored 
 The Green Graduate: Educating Every Student as a Sustainable Practitioner (2011) sets out a framework for integrating sustainability into every course of study.
 Sustainable Lens: a visual guide (2011)  traces the development of sustainability through its representation in diagrams.  It presents a model for seeing the world through a sustainability-driven perspective.

References

External links 
 Official website
 Institutional listing

Living people
Academic staff of Otago Polytechnic
New Zealand computer scientists
University of Otago alumni
Sustainability advocates
Green thinkers
Association of Community Access Broadcasters
Year of birth missing (living people)